Mahesh Bhupathi and Elena Likhovtseva were the defending champions but decided not to play together. Bhupathi played with Paola Suárez and lost in third round to Nenad Zimonjić and Iroda Tulyaganova, while Likhovtseva competed with Bob Bryan and lost in second round to Andy Ram and Anastasia Rodionova.

Leander Paes and Martina Navratilova defeated Ram and Rodionova in the final, 6–3, 6–3 to win the mixed doubles tennis title at the 2003 Wimbledon Championships. It was the 2nd Wimbledon and 3rd mixed doubles title for Paes, and the 4th Wimbledon and 9th mixed doubles title for Navratilova, in their respective careers.

Seeds

  Mahesh Bhupathi /  Paola Suárez (third round)
  Mike Bryan /  Lisa Raymond (quarterfinals)
  Bob Bryan /  Elena Likhovtseva (second round)
  Todd Woodbridge /  Svetlana Kuznetsova (quarterfinals)
  Leander Paes /  Martina Navratilova (champions)
  Wayne Black /  Cara Black (third round)
  Kevin Ullyett /  Daniela Hantuchová (third round)
  Donald Johnson /  Rennae Stubbs (first round)
  Chris Haggard /  Emmanuelle Gagliardi (first round)
  Leoš Friedl /  Liezel Huber (semifinals)
  Cyril Suk /  Maja Matevžič (second round, withdrew)
  Joshua Eagle /  Barbara Schett (second round)
  Petr Pála /  Janette Husárová (second round)
  Graydon Oliver /  Petra Mandula (first round)
  Pavel Vízner /  Nicole Pratt (third round)
  Mariano Hood /  Tina Križan (second round, withdrew)

Draw

Finals

Top half

Section 1

Section 2

Bottom half

Section 3

Section 4

References

External links

2003 Wimbledon Championships on WTAtennis.com
2003 Wimbledon Championships – Doubles draws and results at the International Tennis Federation

X=Mixed Doubles
Wimbledon Championship by year – Mixed doubles